The 1938 San Jose State Spartans football team represented San Jose State College. The Spartans were led by seventh-year head coach Dudley DeGroot and played home games at Spartan Stadium. The team played as an Independent and finished with a record of eleven wins and one loss (11–1).

Schedule

Notes

References

San Jose State
San Jose State Spartans football seasons
San Jose State Spartans football